Cecil Otter's False Hopes is the first official release from Cecil Otter, a founding member of Minneapolis indie hip hop collective Doomtree. It is one of False Hopes albums released by Doomtree Records.

Track listing

Personnel
Credits adapted from liner notes.

 Beautiful Bobby Gorgeous - production (4, 5)
 Cecil Otter - vocals, production (1-3, 7, 8, 11), recorded by, mixed by, mastered by
 Charlie Puleston - guitar (2)
 Emily Bloodmobile - production (4)
 Lazerbeak - production (9)
 MK Larada - production (10), design, layout
 Paper Tiger - scratches (5)
 Sean McPherson - bass (9)
 Turbo Nemesis - scratches (3, 7), recorded by, mixed by, mastered by

References

External links
 

2005 albums
Cecil Otter albums
Doomtree Records albums